Notogomphus praetorius is a species of dragonfly in the family Gomphidae; common names include yellowjack, southern yellowjack and yellowjack longlegs.

Distribution
Southern Africa: Widespread in eastern South Africa, eastern Zimbabwe, Zambia, and the southern part of the Democratic Republic of the Congo. Also recorded in Namibia, Angola, Malawi and Mozambique.

Habitat
Found in and near streams and rivers, both in forests and grasslands; mostly in highlands.

References

External links

Gomphidae
Taxonomy articles created by Polbot
Insects described in 1878